Aaron Wesley Plyler (1 October 1926 – 23 August 2016) was an American businessman and politician.

Born in Monroe, North Carolina, Plyler went to the Benton Heights School and to the Florida Military Academy. He was involved with farming and real estate. Plyler was president of Plyler Grading and Paving Company. Plyler served as a Democratic member of the North Carolina House of Representatives, from 1974 to 1982 and then served in the North Carolina State Senate from 1982 to 2002. Plyler died at his home in Monroe, North Carolina.

References

1926 births
2016 deaths
People from Monroe, North Carolina
Businesspeople from North Carolina
Farmers from North Carolina
Democratic Party members of the North Carolina House of Representatives
Democratic Party North Carolina state senators
21st-century American politicians
20th-century American businesspeople